The , commonly called the Chūō Line, is one of the major trunk railway lines in Japan. It connects Tokyo and Nagoya, although it is the slowest direct railway connection between the two cities; the coastal Tōkaidō Main Line is slightly faster, and the Tōkaidō Shinkansen is currently the fastest rail link between the cities.

Compared to the huge urban areas at either end of the Chūō Line, its central portion is very lightly traveled; the Shiojiri-Nakatsugawa corridor is only served by one limited express and one local service per hour.

The Chūō Main Line passes through the mountainous center of Honshu. Its highest point (near ) is about 900 meters above sea level and much of the line has a gradient of 25 per mil (2.5% or 1 in 40). Along the Chūō East Line section, peaks of the Akaishi and Kiso as well as Mount Yatsugatake can be seen from trains. The Chūō West Line parallels the old Nakasendō highway (famous for the preserved post towns of Tsumago-juku and Magome-juku) and the steep Kiso Valley.

Routes 
Entire Route (Tokyo - Nagoya including branch): 
East Line (Tokyo - Shiojiri): 
Tokyo - Kanda:  (officially part of the Tōhoku Main Line)
Kanda - Yoyogi: 
Yoyogi - Shinjuku:  (officially part of the Yamanote Line)
Shinjuku - Shiojiri: 
East Line - Tatsuno branch line (Okaya - Tatsuno - Shiojiri): 
West Line (Shiojiri - Nagoya): 
Shiojiri - Kanayama: 
Kanayama - Nagoya:  (alongside Tōkaidō Main Line)

Stations and services 

This section lists all stations on the Chūō Main Line and generally explains regional services on the line. In addition, there are limited express services connecting major cities along the line, namely Azusa, Super Azusa, Kaiji, Hamakaiji, Narita Express and Shinano. For details of the limited express trains, see the relevant articles.

Tokyo - Mitaka

The section between Tokyo and Mitaka is grade-separated, with no level crossings. The local tracks are used by the Chūō-Sōbu Line local trains, while the rapid tracks carry rapid service and limited express trains. The Tokyo-Mitaka portion is a vital cross-city rail link.

The former is usually referred to simply as the Chūō Line and the latter the Sōbu Line. Separate groups of trainsets are used for these two groups of services: cars with an orange belt for the rapid service trains and cars with a yellow belt for the local service trains. Signs at stations also use these colors to indicate the services.

This section is located entirely within Tokyo.

Mitaka - Takao

The four-track section ends at Mitaka. Most of the section between Mitaka and Tachikawa had been elevated between 2008 and 2011 to eliminate level crossings. Plans have been proposed to add another two tracks as far as Tachikawa, but were not included in the track elevation.

Takao - Shiojiri
Most of the rapid service trains from Tokyo terminate at Takao, where the line exits the large urban area of Tokyo. The section between Takao and Ōtsuki still carries some commuter trains as well as long distance local trains and Limited Express trains. The Kaiji limited express terminates at Kōfu, the capital of Yamanashi Prefecture, while the Azusa continue beyond Shiojiri to Matsumoto via the Shinonoi Line.

All stations from Tachikawa to Shiojiri are served by the Chūō Main Line Local. Local trains from Tachikawa and Takao run as far as Matsumoto or even Nagano.

Legends:

 ●: All trains stop
 ▲: Stop, eastbound services only
 ▼: Stop, westbound services only

Okaya – Shiojiri

The Okaya-Shiojiri branch is an old route of the Chūō Main Line. It carries a small number of shuttle trains and trains from/to the Iida Line, which branches off at Tatsuno.

It had a reversing layout. The signal station was closed on 12 October 1983.

Shiojiri - Nakatsugawa 

Shiojiri is the dividing point of the East Line and the West Line; no train continues from one to the other. The Shinano limited express is the main service for the rural Shiojiri-Nakatsugawa section.

Nakatsugawa - Nagoya
Local and rapid service trains run on the line from Nakatsugawa to Nagoya. This section carries urban traffic for the Greater Nagoya Area.

Local trains stop at all stations (except Sannō Junction).

Legends:
● : All trains stop
| ↓ ↑ : All trains pass (Arrows indicate the passing direction)
▼ : Only southbound trains stop
▲ : Only northbound trains stop

Junctions

 is a junction between Chino and Kami-Suwa stations in Suwa, Nagano. It entered into use on 2 September 1970.
 is a junction that diverts freight traffic from the Chūō Main Line to the Tōkaidō Line freight branch between Kanayama and Nagoya stations in Nagoya. It entered into use on 10 October 1962.

Rolling stock

Chūō East Line (JR East) 
New E233 series trains entered service on Tokyo-area commuter services from 26 December 2006. These trains are a development of the E231 series used on other commuter lines in the Tokyo area, and replaced the aging 201 series rolling stock introduced on the line in 1981.

From 2017, new E353 series EMUs were introduced on Azusa and Super Azusa limited express services, replacing the E351 and E257 series trains.

Chūō Rapid Line
E233 series
209-1000 series
Chūō-Sōbu Line
E231 series
E231-500 series
Tokyo Metro Tōzai Line
E231-800 series
05 series
07 series
15000 series
Chūō Main Line Local trains
211 series
E127 series
Limited Express
E353 series (Azusa, Kaiji, Fuji Excursion, Hachiōji, Ōme)
E259 series (Narita Express) (Two round trips per day starts/terminates at Takao)
Seasonal services
185 series (Hamakaiji)
215 series (Holiday Rapid View Yamanashi)

Chūō West Line (JR Central) 

Local Trains
211 series
213 series
311 series
313 series
Limited Express
383 series (Shinano)

Freight train 
JNR Class EF64
JR Freight Class EH200

History 
The  opened the initial section of the Chūō Line from Shinjuku Station to Tachikawa Station in 1889. The company then extended the line both westward and eastward (towards Tokyo) until it was nationalised in 1906. The Japanese Government Railways (JGR) then continued to extend the line, reaching Shiojiri the same year, and Tokyo (at ) in 1908. The JGR also built the line from Nagoya, the first section opening in 1900, with the lines connecting in 1911. The Table below gives the section opening dates.

In 1904, the section between Iidamachi Station (formerly located between Suidōbashi Station and Iidabashi Station) and Nakano Station was the first urban electric railway in Japan using 600 V DC. Electrification was extended in 1919 and 1922, was increased to 1,200 V DC when extended to Tokyo in 1927, boosted again to 1,500 V DC in 1929, and reached Kofu in 1931. Electrification from the Nagano end was commissioned in sections from 1966, and the entire line was electrified by 1973.

Notes:
 The section between Okaya Station and Shiojiri Station is the new route that replaced the old route opened on June 11, 1906, by JGR.
 Station names in parentheses are original names.
 Stations marked † are now closed.
 Prior to the connection of the East Line and the West Line in 1911, the section between Shiojiri Station and Miyanokoshi Station belonged to the East Line.

Former connecting lines

 Mitaka Station: A  line to a Nakajima Aircraft factory opened in 1942, and was closed in 1945. In 1950, the factory site was used to build a sports stadium. The line from Mitaka to  reopened on 14 April 1951, but was closed again on 1 November 1959.
 Kokubunji Station: A  line was opened in 1910 to haul gravel from the Tamagawa. It closed in 1914 due to flood damage, but was reopened in 1916 after being rebuilt by the Japanese Army. On 26 May 1920, the line was absorbed into JNR, but operations were suspended from 1 December 1921. A  extension to the Tokyo Racecourse opened on 1934. Services on the line were suspended from 1 October 1944, resuming from 24 April 1947. On 1 April 1973, the line to Tokyo Racecourse closed and the line was absorbed into the Musashino Line.
 Kofu Station: The Yamanashi Horse-drawn tramway opened its first  gauge section in 1898, and by 1904 had opened two lines (to Katsunuma and Fujikawa) totaling . In 1930, the Katsunuma Line was closed, and the other line was closed beyond Kai-Aoyagi,  from Kofu. The company renamed itself the Yamanashi Electric Railway, regauged (to 1,067 mm) and electrified the line at 600 V DC, and operated it until 1962.
 Sakashita Station: The   gauge Sakagawa Line was opened to Maruno by the Hisaka River Railway in 1926. A passenger service was operated  to Okuya. The Forest Service opened a  line connecting at Maruno the same year, and a  branch from Okuya that operated from 1933 until 1958. In 1944, the Forest Service took over the Sakagawa line, operating it until 1961, when the entire  line closed.
 Nakatsugawa Station: The Kitaena Railway operated the  Enaden Line to Tsukechi, electrified at 600 V DC, from 1924 until 1978.
 Ena Station: The Iwamura Electric Railway operated a  line electrified at 600 V DC to its namesake town between 1906 and 1935. A  line to the site of Oi dam was opened in 1922 to transport construction materials. Upon the dam's completion, the line was sold to the Kita-Ena Railway. but it closed in 1934.
 Tokishi Station: The Ogawa Railway opened a  line to its namesake town between 1922 and 1924. The line was electrified at 1,500 V DC in 1950, and closed as a result of flood damage in 1972.
 Yabuhara Station: The Ogiso Forest line operated for an unknown period.
 Agematsu Station: The Otaki Forest Railway operated between 1911 and 1975.
 Nojiri Station: The Nojiri Forest Railway operated for an unknown period.
 Tajima Station: The Kasahara Railway opened a  line to its namesake town in 1928. Passenger services ceased in 1971, and the line closed in 1978.

Proposed connecting lines
 Chino Station: The Saku Railway, which had built the line from Komoro on the Shinetsu Line to Koumi, proposed to build a line from Tanaka on the Shinetsu Line to this station. The company was nationalised before construction started, and JGR connected the Koumi line to the Chuo Main Line in 1935, making this proposal redundant.

Accidents
On September 12, 1997, a Super Azusa limited express bound for Matsumoto collided with a 201 series local train that failed to stop at a red signal while passing through Ōtsuki Station.

References

External links 

 
Lines of East Japan Railway Company
Lines of Central Japan Railway Company
Railway lines opened in 1889
1067 mm gauge railways in Japan
1500 V DC railway electrification
1889 establishments in Japan